Chrisland Schools is a conglomerate of schools that has provided education for Nursery, Primary and Secondary School students in Nigeria, with its schools spread across Lagos and Abuja. Pending further investigation on allegations of sexual violence involving students of one of the Chrisland schools, the government has mandated the temporary and potentially permanent shutdown of these schools.

History
The first Chrisland School was founded on 3 October 1977 by an educationist, High Chief Dr. (Mrs.) Winifred Adefolahan Awosika, OON, at Ikeja. Aside the Ikeja campus, the school sites are now in Lekki, Ladipo Oluwole, Festac, Idimu, Victoria Garden City (VGC), and Abuja

Schools and founding dates

Chrisland School, Ladipo Oluwole – 3 October 1977
Chrisland School, Opebi – 2 October 1978
Chrisland College, Idimu – 27 February 1987
Chrisland School, VGC – 5 October 1998
Chrisland Nursery School, VGC – 5 October 1998
Chrisland High School, VGC – 23 October 2006
Chrisland High School, Ikeja – 15 September 2008
Chrisland Pre-Degree College – 27 September 2010
Chrisland School, Abuja – September, 2014
Chrisland High School, Abuja – 17 September 2015
Chrisland High School, Lekki – 11 September 2017

Controversies
In 2016, the mother of a two-year-old pupil raised the alarm that her child was raped by her teacher, Adeboyega Adenekan. The school denied the claim and stood with the teacher by proclaiming his innocence. The Lagos State Government took over the case and on October 24, 2019, the Ikeja Sexual Offences and Domestic Violence Court found the teacher guilty of a one-count charge of rape of a minor. He was sentenced to sixty years in prison.

Minor Sex
On April 17, 2022, a ten-year-old pupil of Chrisland was reported to have been coerced into engaging in a sexual act with some students of the same school at the World School Games in Dubai while performing a truth or dare game. The sexual act was filmed and distributed across multiple social media platforms in Nigeria. The school, in a letter accused the minor of participating in the sexual act willingly and therefore suspended her. The minor's mother in a viral video alleged that the school threatened to kill her daughter if she speaks out, while also insisting that her child was raped.

The news drew public uproar and the Lagos State Government in a statement on April 18, 2022, ordered the immediate closure of the school alongside all other annexes within the state. It also promised to take up the investigation and prosecution.

Extra curriculum activities
The VGC campus of the school celebrated her inaugural career day on 30 April 2015. The event was coordinated by the principal of the school, professor John Viljoen

In 2016, Chrisland Schools beat out other participants including Atlantic Hall, Meadow Hall, Day Waterman College, Temple Schools and Noble house to win the AISEN Volleyball Competition in the Senior Girls Category.

On the 3rd day of December 2016, Chrisland Schools, Lagos, won the 10-school Loya Milk Swimming Competition tagged  Loya Swim Meet. A competition organised by Loya Milk to boost swimming in secondary schools in the country.

In 2016, Chrisland High School, Ikeja won the junior category for the Lagos Zone (which involved schools in the Southern part of the country) of the National History Competition with 80 points.

Uwetu Obadiah-Franklin of Chrisland High School, Abuja defeated contestants from sixteen other countries to win the 2016 TSL International Schools Essay/ Debate competition in Dubai.

Also in 2016, Chrisland High School, VGC finished 1st out of 37 schools that participated in the South Western Zone Nigeria regionals of the International Geography Olympiad.

In the annual literary competition, tagged Teecoks writing competition held in February 2017, Ibukunoluwa Addy of Chrisland College, Idimu, finished first in the prose category of the competition.

As part of its 40th anniversary, Chrisland Schools on the 2nd day of March, 2017, commissioned the Chrisland High Performance Centre at the 24th Annual Inter-house Sports Competition of Chrisland College Idimu, Lagos State with a host of dignitaries attending.

In March 2017, Chrisland School students participated in PROJECT WET; an initiative by Nestle Nigeria Plc in commemoration of the United Nations World Water Day for proper water management in the society as a standard for meeting water challenges to save the environment and ecological system.

Scholarships and awards

Chrisland Schools has been given numerous awards over its history. Some of which include African Success Award (2008), All Primary School Pedachess Competition 2009, 2010, 2011, The African Best Quality School (2007), Scrabble Competition (2011), ECOWAS International Gold Award. Top 10 Private School 3 Times Winner of W/African Practice Award for Quality Education #rd out of 25300 Schools in National Level of Mathematics Competition (1 stage)

In 2013, Chrisland Schools awarded scholarships worth N27 million to six pupils, who came tops at the annual entrance examination that held in March.
The award, solely sponsored by the chairman and Founder, Chrisland Schools Limited, Dr.Winifred Awosika, lasts for six years and covers their secondary education.

In the 2014/2015 academic year, the number of scholarships was increased from 6 to 10 pupils according to managing director, Chrisland Schools, Mrs. Ronke Adeyemi. She stated that the founder Dr. Awosika decided to increase scholarship recipients from six to 10 in line with her commitment to encouraging academic excellence.

Chrisland Schools secured an Outstanding Rating in the 2017 Whole School Evaluation by the Office of Education Quality Assurance, a division of the Ministry of Education.

The exercise was carried out by District 1 Evaluators in Lagos State in November 2016. A revisit was made by the office in March 2017 to validate their findings, and found that the report was reliable and objective.

Notable alumni
 Israel Adesanya, mixed martial artist, former UFC Middleweight Champion.
 Omotola Jalade Ekeinde, Nollywood actress.
Somkele Iyamah also known as Somkele Iyamah-Idhalama, a Nigerian TV and film actress and model.
Kaffy born Kafayat Oluwatoyin Shafau is a Nigerian dancer, choreographer, dance instructor and fitness coach.
David Onyemata, defensive tackle with the New Orleans Saints of the National Football League.

See also
British International School Lagos
Greenspring School

References

External links
 Official website

Secondary schools in Lagos State
Primary schools in Nigeria
Schools in Lagos
Schools in Lagos State
1977 establishments in Nigeria